Porcellio pumicatus is a species of woodlouse in the genus Porcellio belonging to the family Porcellionidae. This species is known to occur in Central Italy and on Sardinia.

References

Porcellionidae
Woodlice of Europe
Crustaceans described in 1885